"Wipe Me Down" is a song by American rapper Foxx, included as a song on the Trill Entertainment compilation album Trill Entertainment Presents: Survival of the Fittest (2007). The song's backing track was composed by American record producer Mouse On Tha Track. A remixed version, featuring additional vocals from fellow rappers Lil Boosie and Webbie, was released as a single in 2007, with Lil Boosie listed as the lead artist. There is another remixed version featuring UGK, Foxx has different vocals than the other remix version along with vocals from Pimp C & Bun B.

Charts

Weekly charts

Year-end charts

Radio and release history

References 

2007 singles
2007 songs
Webbie songs
Lil Boosie songs
Songs written by Webbie